Anna Simpson (born March 23, 1983) is an American actress and singer born in Brooklyn, New York. She is best known for the film Our Song (2000), starring alongside Kerry Washington and Melissa Martinez. Simpson gave birth to her daughter, Angel Theory, at age 16; Theory would go on to appear as Kelly on The Walking Dead. Simpson is a survivor of domestic abuse and she uses her real life experiences to help others who had to go through similar hardships. Most recently, she obtained her associate degree in an automotive school.

Filmography

References

External links

Living people
1985 births
People from Brooklyn
Actresses from New York City
21st-century American actresses